In Marxian economics and preceding theories, the problem of primitive accumulation (also called previous accumulation, original accumulation) of capital concerns the origin of capital, and therefore of how class distinctions between possessors and non-possessors came to be.

Adam Smith's account of primitive-original accumulation depicted a peaceful process, in which some workers laboured more diligently than others and gradually built up wealth, eventually leaving the less diligent workers to accept living wages for their labour. Karl Marx rejected this account as "childish" for its omission of the role of violence, war, enslavement and colonialism in the historical accumulation of land and wealth. Marxist scholar David Harvey explains Marx's primitive accumulation as a process which principally "entailed taking land, say, enclosing it, and expelling a resident population to create a landless proletariat, and then releasing the land into the privatized mainstream of capital accumulation".

Naming and translations
The concept was initially referred to in various different ways, and the expression of an "accumulation" at the origin of capitalism began to appear with Adam Smith. James Steuart, with his 1767 work, is considered by some scholars as the greatest classical theorist of primitive accumulation.

Myths of political economy
In disinterring the origins of capital, Marx felt the need to dispel what he felt were religious myths and fairy-tales about the origins of capitalism. Marx wrote:

What must be explained is how the capitalist relations of production are historically established; in other words, how it comes about that means of production become privately owned and traded, and how capitalists can find workers on the labour market ready and willing to work for them, because they have no other means of livelihood (also referred to as the "reserve army of labour".)

Link with colonialism
At the same time as local obstacles to investment in manufactures are being overcome, and a unified national market is developing with a nationalist ideology, Marx sees a strong impulse to business development coming from world trade:

Privatization
According to Marx, the purpose of primitive accumulation is to privatize the means of production, so that the exploiting owner class can profit from the surplus labour of those who, lacking other means, must work for them.

Marx says that primitive accumulation means the expropriation of the direct producers, and more specifically "the dissolution of private property based on the labour of its owner... Self-earned private property, that is based, so to say, on the fusing together of the isolated, independent labouring-individual with the conditions of his labour, is supplanted by capitalistic private property, which rests on exploitation of the nominally free labour of others, i.e., on wage-labour (emphasis added).

Social relations of capitalism
In the last chapter of Capital, Volume I, Marx described the social conditions he thought necessary for capitalism with a comment about Edward Gibbon Wakefield's theory of colonization:

This is indicative of Marx's more general fascination with settler colonialism, and his interest in how "free" lands—or, more accurately, lands seized from indigenous people—could disrupt capitalist social relations.

Ongoing primitive accumulation

"Orthodox" Marxists see primitive accumulation as a process beginning in the late Middle Ages and finishing with the rise of capitalist industry, situated entirely within the transition from the feudal mode of production to the capitalist mode of production. However, this can be seen as a misrepresentation of both Marx's ideas and historical reality, since feudal-type economies persist in various parts of the world, even in the 21st century.

Marx's description of primitive accumulation may also be seen as a special case of the general principle of capitalist market expansion. In part, trade grows incrementally, but often the establishment of capitalist relations of production involves force and violence; transforming property relations means that assets previously owned by some people are no longer owned by them, but by other people, and making people part with their assets in this way involves coercion. This is an ongoing process of expropriation, proletarianization and urbanization.

In his preface to Das Kapital Vol. 1, Marx compares the situations of England and Germany and points out that less developed countries also face a process of primitive accumulation. Marx comments that "if, however, the German reader shrugs his shoulders at the condition of the English industrial and agricultural labourers, or in optimist fashion comforts himself with the thought that in Germany things are not nearly so bad, I must plainly tell him, " (the tale is told of you!)".

Marx was referring here to the expansion of the capitalist mode of production (not the expansion of world trade), through expropriation processes. He continues, "Intrinsically, it is not a question of the higher or lower degree of development of the social antagonism that results from the natural laws of capitalist production. It is a question of these laws themselves, of these tendencies working with iron necessity towards inevitable results. The country that is more developed industrially only shows, to the less developed, the image of its own future."

David Harvey's theory of accumulation by dispossession 

David Harvey expands the concept of "primitive accumulation" to create a new concept, "accumulation by dispossession", in his 2003 book, The New Imperialism. Like Mandel, Harvey claims that the word "primitive" leads to a misunderstanding of the history of capitalism: that the original, "primitive" phase of capitalism is somehow a transitory phase that need not be repeated once commenced. Instead, Harvey maintains that primitive accumulation ("accumulation by dispossession") is a continuing process within the process of capital accumulation on a world scale. Because the central Marxian notion of crisis via "over-accumulation" is assumed to be a constant factor in the process of capital accumulation, the process of "accumulation by dispossession" acts as a possible safety valve that may temporarily ease the crisis. This is achieved by simply lowering the prices of consumer commodities (thus pushing up the propensity for general consumption), which in turn is made possible by the considerable reduction in the price of production inputs. Should the magnitude of the reduction in the price of inputs outweigh the reduction in the price of consumer goods, it can be said that the rate of profit will, for the time being, increase. Thus:

Harvey's theoretical extension encompasses more recent economic dimensions such as intellectual property rights, privatization, and predation and exploitation of nature and folk lore.

Privatization of public services puts enormous profit into capitalists' hands. If it belonged to the public sector, this profit would not exist. In this sense, the profit is created by dispossession of peoples or nations. Destructive industrial use of the environment is similar because the environment "naturally" belongs to everyone, or to no one: factually, it "belongs" to whoever lives there.

Multinational pharmaceutical companies collect information about how herb or other natural medicine is used among natives in less-developed country, do some R&D to find the material that make those natural medicines effective, and patent the findings. By doing so, multinational pharmaceutical companies can now sell the medicine to the natives who are the original source of the knowledge that made production of medicine possible. That is, dispossession of folklore (knowledge, wisdom, practice) through intellectual property rights.

David Harvey also argues that accumulation by dispossession is a temporal or partial solution to over-accumulation. Because accumulation by dispossession makes raw materials cheaper, the profit rate can at least temporarily go up.

Harvey's interpretation has been criticized by Brass, who disputes the view that what is described as present-day primitive accumulation, or accumulation by dispossession, entails proletarianization. Because the latter is equated by Harvey with the separation of the direct producer (mostly smallholders) from the means of production (land), Harvey assumes this results in the formation of a workforce that is free. By contrast, Brass points out that in many instances the process of depeasantization leads to workers who are unfree, because they are unable personally to commodify or recommodify their labour-power, by selling it to the highest bidder.

Schumpeter's critique of Marx's theory
The economist Joseph Schumpeter disagreed with the Marxian explanation of the origin of capital, because Schumpeter did not believe in exploitation. In liberal economic theory, the market returns to all people the exact value they have provided it; capitalists are just people who are very adept at saving and whose contributions are especially magnificent, and they do not take anything away from other people or the environment. Liberals believe that capitalism has no internal flaws or contradictions; only external threats. To liberals, the idea of the necessity of violent primitive accumulation to capital is particularly incendiary. Schumpeter wrote rather testily:

Schumpeter argued that imperialism was not a necessary jump-start for capitalism, nor is it needed to bolster capitalism, because imperialism pre-existed capitalism. Schumpeter believed that, whatever the empirical evidence, capitalist world trade could in principle expand peacefully. Where imperialism occurrs, Schumpeter asserted, it has nothing to do with the intrinsic nature of capitalism itself, or of capitalist market expansion. The distinction between Schumpeter and Marx here is subtle. Marx claimed that capitalism requires violence and imperialism—first, to kick-start capitalism with a pile of booty and to dispossess a population to induce them to enter into capitalist relations as workers, and then to surmount the otherwise-fatal contradictions generated within capitalist relations over time. Schumpeter's view was that imperialism is an atavistic impulse pursued by a state, independent of the interests of the economic ruling class.

See also 

 Accumulation by dispossession
 Enclosure
 Capital accumulation
 Common land
 History of capitalism
 The Origin of the Family, Private Property and the State
 Relations of production
 Socialist accumulation

References

Further reading 

 David Harvey (2005) The New Imperialism Oxford University Press. , 
 Perelman, Michael The Invention of Capitalism: Classical Political Economy and the Secret History of Primitive Accumulation Published by Duke University Press, 2000 , 
Tom Brass (2011) Labour Regime Change in the Twenty-First Century: Unfreedom, Capitalism and Primitive Accumulation. Published by Brill (Leiden), .
 Adam Smith (1776) The Wealth of Nations 
 James Denham-Steuart (1767) An Inquiry into the Principles of Political Economy
 Karl Marx, Das Kapital, Vol. 1, chapter 26 Economic Manuscripts: Capital Vol. I - Chapter Twenty-Six
 James Glassman (2006) Primitive accumulation, accumulation by dispossession, accumulation by ‘extra-economic’ means – Progress in Human Geography, Vol. 30, No. 5, 608–625 (2006) 
 Masimo de Angelis paper Marx on Primitive Accumulation: a Reinterpretation.
 Paul Zarembka paper 
 Bill Warren, Imperialism, pioneer of capitalism.
 Ernest Mandel, Late Capitalism.
 Ernest Mandel, Primitive accumulation and the industrialisation of the third world.
 R. J. Holton, The Transition from Feudalism to Capitalism
 Andre Gunder Frank, World accumulation, 1492–1789. New York 1978
 Guardian article, "The New Liberal Imperialism"Robert Cooper: the new liberal imperialism
 Raymond Aron, "What Empires cost and what profits they bring" (1962), reprinted in Raymond Aron, The Dawn of Universal History. New York: Basic Books, 2002, pp. 407–418.
 Ankie Hoogvelt, Globalisation and the Postcolonial World: The New Political Economy of Development.
 Ankie Hoogvelt interview: Interview with Ankie Hoogvelt
 Jeffrey Sachs, The end of poverty; how we can make it happen in our lifetime (with a foreword by Bono). Penguin Books, 2005.
 David Harvey, Reading Marx's Capital, Reading Marx’s Capital – Class 12, Chapters 26–33, The Secret of Primitive Accumulation (video lecture)
 Midnight Notes "The New Enclosures"

External links 

Classical economics
Marxian economics
Imperialism studies
Rivera Vicencio, E. (2018) ‘Conformation  of  the  primitive  accumulation  and  capitalist spirit.  Theory  of corporate  governmentality’, Int.   J.Critical   Accounting,  Vol.  10,  No.  5,  pp.394–425.  https://www.inderscienceonline.com/doi/pdf/10.1504/IJCA.2018.096783